The 2019 Garden Open was a professional tennis tournament played on clay courts. It was the eleventh edition of the tournament which was part of the 2019 ATP Challenger Tour. It took place in Rome, Italy between 6 and 12 May 2019.

Singles main-draw entrants

Seeds

 1 Rankings as of 29 April 2019.

Other entrants
The following players received wildcards into the singles main draw:
  Ryan Harrison
  Federico Iannaccone
  Emiliano Maggioli
  Julian Ocleppo
  Francesco Passaro

The following player received entry into the singles main draw as an alternate:
  Peter Torebko

The following players received entry into the singles main draw using their ITF World Tennis Ranking:
  Riccardo Bonadio
  Hernán Casanova
  Peter Heller
  Grégoire Jacq
  Skander Mansouri

The following players received entry from the qualifying draw:
  Luca Margaroli
  Nicolò Turchetti

Champions

Singles

  Henri Laaksonen def.  Gian Marco Moroni 6–7(2–7), 7–6(7–2), 6–2.

Doubles

  Philipp Oswald /  Filip Polášek def.  Nikola Čačić /  Adam Pavlásek Walkover.

References

2019 ATP Challenger Tour
2019
2019 in Italian tennis
May 2019 sports events in Italy